Area code 765 is a telephone area code in the North American Numbering Plan (NANP) for the central part of the U.S. state of Indiana. The numbering plan area comprises a horseshoe-shaped region of twenty counties in Central Indiana except for the Indianapolis area, which is served by area codes 317 and 463. Some cities included are  Anderson, Connersville, Crawfordsville, Frankfort, Greencastle, Kokomo, Lafayette, Marion, Muncie, New Castle, Richmond, and West Lafayette. The area code was created in 1997 in a split of area code 317.

History
In 1947, American Telephone and Telegraph (AT&T) published the first configuration of proposed numbering plan areas (NPAs) for a new nationwide numbering and toll call routing system. Indiana was divided to receive two area codes. Area code 317 served the northern two-thirds of Indiana, while area code 812 served the southern third. In the first change of the original plan in 1948, 317 was cut back to central Indiana, while the northern third of Indiana, including Gary, Hammond, East Chicago, South Bend, Elkhart and Fort Wayne, received area code 219.

Prior to 1996, numbering plan area 317 consisted of all of Central Indiana. Eventually, population growth and increased demand for telecommunication services required an area code split to provide more central office prefixes for the region. Beginning on February 1, 1997, with mandatory dialing effective June 28, the greater Indianapolis area retained area code 317 and the remainder of Central Indiana received the new area code 765.  The creation of 765 came amid some fanfare, as it was Indiana's first new area code in 49 years.

Service area
Entire counties

 Blackford County
 Clinton County
 Delaware County
 Fayette County
 Fountain County
 Grant County
 Henry County
 Howard County
 Montgomery County
 Parke County
 Putnam County
 Randolph County
 Rush County
 Tippecanoe County
 Tipton County
 Warren County
 Wayne County
 Union County
 Vermillion County

Partial counties

 Benton County
 Boone County
 Carroll County
 Clay County
 Decatur County
 Franklin County
 Hancock County
 Hamilton County
 Hendricks County
 Jay County
 Madison County
 Miami County
 Morgan County
 Shelby County
 Wabash County
 Wells County
 White County
 Vigo County

References

765
765